Peter Connelly may refer to:

 the baby Peter Connelly, see Killing of Peter Connelly
 Peter Connelly, video games composer

See also
Peter Connolly (disambiguation)